|}

The Critérium International is a Group 1 flat horse race in France open to two-year-old thoroughbred colts and fillies. It is run at Saint-Cloud over a distance of 1,600 metres (1 mile), and it is scheduled to take place each year in late October or early November.

History
The event was established at Saint-Cloud in 2001, when it was introduced as part of a restructured program for juveniles in France and replaced the Prix de la Salamandre which was discontinued in 2000. It was given the same title as a race held annually at Longchamp from 1893 to 1910. The modern race was originally run over 1,600 furlongs but was reduced to 1,400 metres in 2015 as part of a series of changes to autumn races for two-year-olds. In 2018 the race was transferred from Saint-Cloud to Longchamp. The distance returned to 1,600 metres in 2020 as part of a two-year trial.

The current version of the Critérium International often features horses which ran previously in the Prix des Chênes or the Prix Thomas Bryon.

Records
Leading jockey (4 wins):
 Christophe Soumillon – Dalakhani (2002), Carlotamix (2005), Thunder Snow (2016), Royal Meeting (2018)

Leading trainer (5 wins):
 Aidan O'Brien – Mount Nelson (2006), Jan Vermeer (2009), Roderic O'Connor (2010), Johannes Vermeer (2015), Van Gogh (2020)

Leading owner (5 wins): (includes part ownership)
 Sue Magnier / Derrick Smith / Michael Tabor – Mount Nelson (2006), Jan Vermeer (2009), Roderic O'Connor (2010), Johannes Vermeer (2015), Van Gogh (2020)

Winners

Longchamp 1893–1910
The original Critérium International at Longchamp was also for two-year-olds. It was contested on a straight track over 1,100 metres. It was held on the first or second Saturday in October. The prize money was 25,000 francs (equivalent to €78,500).

 1893: Bayadere
 1894: Fragola
 1895: Hero
 1896: Atys
 1897: Cazabat
 1898: Perth
 1899: Semendria
 1900: Pierre Infernale
 1901: Derbouka
 1902: Mireille
 1903: Gouvernant
 1904: Jardy
 1905: Blue Fly
 1906: Calomel
 1907: Halima
 1908: Azalee
 1909: Marsa
 1910: Blina

See also
 List of French flat horse races

References

 Le Figaro:
 1893, 1894, 1894, 1895, 1896, 1896, 1897, 1898, 1899, 1900
 1901, 1902, 1903, 1904, 1905, 1906, 1907, 1908, 1909, 1910
 Racing Post:
 

Flat horse races for two-year-olds
Longchamp Racecourse
Horse races in France
Recurring sporting events established in 2001
2001 establishments in France